Larry Pedrie is an American ice hockey coach and former player. He has held several coaching and administrative positions over more than 35 years at both the professional and amateur level.

Career
Pedrie attended Ferris State where he played on the varsity team for four years. In his junior season the Bulldogs jumped up to Division I, finishing the season as CCHA Runners-Up and the following year as conference semifinalists. After graduating in 1981 Pedrie immediately turned to coaching, joining the staff at his alma mater for three seasons before moving on to both Illinois–Chicago and Michigan in the same capacity. In 1990 Pedrie got his first had coaching job with Illinois–Chicago, and produced modest gains the first year. In six seasons with the Flames Pedrie's team lost 20 games each season and lost 10 of 11 postseasons games. The university terminated the hockey program after the 1996 season but Pedrie received several job offers, accepting a position as an advance scout for the Chicago Blackhawks.

Pedrie founded a youth hockey clinic in 1997, Larry Pedrie Hockey, which his still runs (as of 2018) while continuing his career in hockey management. he was also the commissioner of the NAHL for three seasons after the turn of the century.

Head coaching record

References

External links

Year of birth unknown
Living people
American ice hockey coaches
UIC Flames men's ice hockey coaches
Ice hockey coaches from Michigan
Sportspeople from Detroit
American men's ice hockey defensemen
Year of birth missing (living people)
Ice hockey people from Detroit